Naughty Boy is an English DJ, musician and producer.

Naughty Boy or Naughty Boys may also refer to:

 Naughty Boy (film), a 1962 Bollywood film
 "Naughty Boy" (song), a 1997 single by Australian band The Mavis's
 Naughty Boy, a 1982 arcade game by Jaleco
 Naughty Boy, a German dance group featuring members of Bass Bumpers
 Naughty Boy Ma Xiaotiao or Mo's Mischief (淘气包马小跳), a Chinese series of children's books by Yang Hongying
 Naughty Boys (album), a 1982 music album by Yellow Magic Orchestra
"Naughty Boy", a 2018 song by Pentagon from the EP Thumbs Up!

See also 
 Naughty Girl (disambiguation)
 Nasty Boys (disambiguation)